E233 may refer to:
 Thiabendazole, a food additive
 E233 series, a Japanese train type
 European route E233, a European Class-B road in the Netherlands and Germany